Theo is a given name and a hypocorism.

Greek origin
Many names beginning with the root "Theo-" derive from the Ancient Greek word theos  (θεός), which means god, for example:
Feminine names: Thea, Theodora, Theodosia, Theophania, Theophano  and Theoxena
Masculine names: Theodore, Theodoros/Theodorus, Theodosius, Theodotus, Theophanes, Theophilus, Theodoret and Theophylact

Germanic origin
Many other names beginning with "Theo-" do not necessarily derive from Greek, but rather the old Germanic "theud", meaning "people" or "folk". These names include: 
Theobald, Theodahad, Theodard, Theodebert, Theodemir, and Theodoric

People with the name Theo
See Theo and Théo for a current alphabetical list of all people with the first name Theo or Théo in the English Wikipedia.

Among better known people with this name are: 

 Theo Adam (1926-2019), German classical bass-baritone
 Theo Albrecht (1922–2010), German entrepreneur and billionaire
 Theo Angelopoulos (1935–2012), Greek filmmaker, screenwriter and film producer
 Theo Bos (born 1983), Dutch road and track cyclist, five-time world champion
 Theo van Doesburg (1883–1931), Dutch artist, founder and leader of the De Stijl art movement
 Theo Epstein (born 1973), American baseball executive, three-time World Series champion
 Theo Fleury (born 1968), Canadian ice hockey player
 Theo Geisel (1904–1991), American author better known as Dr. Seuss
 Theo van Gogh (art dealer) (1857–1891), brother and supporter of painter Vincent van Gogh
 Theo van Gogh (film director) (1957–2004), Dutch film director, great-grandson of the above
 Theo Heemskerk (1852–1932), Dutch Prime Minister
 Theo Hernandez (born 1997), French footballer
 Theo Hutchcraft (born 1986), English singer and songwriter
 Theo Jackson (disambiguation), multiple people
 Theo James (born 1984), English actor
 Theo Jansen (born 1948), Dutch artist and kinetic sculptor
 Theo Janssen (born 1981), Dutch footballer
 Theo Jörgensmann (born 1948), German jazz clarinetist and composer
 Théo Lefèvre (1914–1973), Belgian Prime Minister
 Theo Lingen (1903–1978), German actor, film director and screenwriter
 Theo Mackeben (1897–1953), German composer and conductor 
 Theo Osterkamp (1892–1975), German flying ace in both World War I and World War II
 Theo Pelouze (1807–1867), French chemist
 Theo de Raadt (born 1968), South African-born Canadian founder and leader of the OpenBSD and OpenSSH projects
 Theo Ratliff (born 1973), American basketball player (Theophalus)
 Theo Rossi (born 1975), American actor and producer
 Théo van Rysselberghe (1862–1926), Belgian neo-impressionist painter
 Théo Sarapo (1936–1970), French singer and actor, husband of Édith Piaf
 Theo Smyrnaeus (fl. 100 CE), Greek philosopher and mathematician (Theon)
 Theo Sommer (1930–2022), German newspaper editor and intellectual
 Theo Timmer (born 1949), Dutch motorcycle racer
 Theo Timmermans (footballer born 1926), Dutch footballer
 Theo Timmermans (born 1989), Dutch footballer
 Theo Von (born 1980), American stand-up comedian, television personality, host, and actor
 Theo Waigel (born 1939), German politician, known as the father of the Euro
 Theo Walcott (born 1989), English footballer
 Theo Zagorakis (born 1971), Greek footballer and politician

Fictional characters 
 Theo, the self-proclaimed 'King of All the Land', protagonist of Ultra Jump Mania and Tari's first companion in the Meta Runner web series
 Theo Decker, main character in Donna Tartt's novel The Goldfinch
 Theo Faron, the main character in P.D. James's 1992 novel The Children of Men and of the 2006 film Children of Men based on the novel
 Theo Fobius, in the webcomic Schlock Mercenary
 Theo Kojak, lead character of the Kojak television series
 Theo Raeken, a fictional character in the 2011-2017 TV series Teen Wolf
 Theo Saville, one of the main characters on the television series A Million Little Things, son of Eddie and Katherine

See also 
 Teo (disambiguation)
 THEO (Testing the Habitability of Enceladus's Ocean), a spacecraft mission to Enceladus

References 

Masculine given names
Dutch masculine given names
Hypocorisms
English masculine given names